The 1932 Virginia Cavaliers football team represented the University of Virginia during the 1932 college football season. The Cavaliers were led by second-year head coach Fred Dawson and played their home games at Scott Stadium in Charlottesville, Virginia. They competed as members of the Southern Conference, finishing with a conference record of 2–3 and a 5–4 record overall.

Schedule

References

Virginia
Virginia Cavaliers football seasons
Virginia Cavaliers football